The 1987 Vanderbilt Commodores football team represented Vanderbilt University in the 1987 NCAA Division I-A football season as a member of the Southeastern Conference (SEC). The Commodores were led by head coach Watson Brown in his second season and finished with a record of four wins and seven losses (4–7 overall, 1–5 in the SEC).

Schedule

References

Vanderbilt
Vanderbilt Commodores football seasons
Vanderbilt Commodores football